Bimaran is a locality, 11 km west of Jalalabad in Afghanistan.

It is well known for the discovery of the Bimaran casket in one of the stupas (stupa Nb 2) located at Bimaran.

Altogether five ancient stupas are known in Bimaran, all dating to the 1st century BCE-1st century CE:
 Stupa No1: , in the fields southeast of the Bimaran village. It has a circumference of 38.40 meters.
  Stupa No2: , in the Bimaran village. It has a circumference of 43.90 meters.
  Stupa No3: , in the Bimaran village. It has a circumference of 33 meters.
  Stupa No4: , in the Bimaran village. It has a circumference of 43.9 meters.

Nearby is:
 Passani Stupa No1:

External links
 Bimaran (US Department of Defense), via Colorado State University

References

Jalalabad
Stupas in Afghanistan
Archaeological sites in Afghanistan